Ahmed Gad (born 23 July 1978) is an Egyptian rower. He competed in the men's lightweight coxless four event at the 2008 Summer Olympics.

References

External links
 
 

1978 births
Living people
Egyptian male rowers
Olympic rowers of Egypt
Rowers at the 2008 Summer Olympics
Sportspeople from Cairo